The 1949 AAFC Draft was the third and last collegiate draft of the All-America Football Conference (AAFC). The teams traded draft choices for the first time in league history. New York sent their first round pick to Chicago, which selected Pete Elliott. Brooklyn traded their second round pick to New York, which selected Lou Kusserow. Chicago traded their third round pick to Buffalo, which selected Hugh Keeney.

Secret Draft
The AAFC held an initial secret draft on July 8, 1948. It consisted of two rounds and was held before the start of the college football season, in order to give the league and advantage on signing players over the National Football League. Two of the selections (Ernie Stautner and Levi Jackson) were voided by league Commissioner Oliver Kessing, because the players were juniors and had college eligibility remaining for the 1949 season.

Player selections

References

External links
 1949 AAFC Draft
 1949 AAFC Draft Pick Transactions

All-America Football Conference
All-America Football Conference
AAFC
AAFC Draft